Andrew Jay Hinch (born May 15, 1974) is an American professional baseball coach and former player who is the manager of the Detroit Tigers of Major League Baseball (MLB). Hinch played catcher for the Oakland Athletics (–), Kansas City Royals (–), Detroit Tigers, and Philadelphia Phillies.

After retiring from his playing career, Hinch managed the Arizona Diamondbacks from May 2009 to July 2010, and was vice president of professional scouting for the San Diego Padres from September 2010 to August 2014. He managed the Houston Astros from 2015 through 2019, winning the 2017 World Series over the Los Angeles Dodgers, but was fired after being suspended for the 2020 season for his role in the Houston Astros sign stealing scandal. The Tigers hired Hinch before the 2021 season.

Early life
Hinch lived in Nashua, Iowa, until he was eight, when he moved to Oklahoma. He is a 1992 graduate of Midwest City High School in Midwest City, Oklahoma, where, as a senior, he was the 1992 National Gatorade Player of the Year in baseball. He was drafted in the second round of the Major League Baseball draft but elected to attend Stanford University, where he was a third-round pick after his junior year in 1995. He decided to return to school and was again a third-round pick as a senior in 1996. At Stanford he joined Delta Tau Delta International Fraternity. Hinch won a bronze medal for the United States at the 1996 Atlanta Olympics and was named to the 1998 Topps All-Star Rookie Team. Hinch is married to his wife, Erin Hinch, with two daughters Haley and Kaitlin.

Playing career
Hinch was drafted by the Oakland Athletics in the third round of the 1996 Major League Baseball Draft. He signed with the Athletics in June 1996. He debuted with the Athletics in 1998 and remained with the team through the 2000 season.

In the 2000–01 offseason, Hinch was traded to the Kansas City Royals with Ángel Berroa as part of a 3-team trade that sent Ben Grieve from the Athletics to the Tampa Bay Devil Rays, Cory Lidle from the Devil Rays to the Athletics, Roberto Hernández from the Devil Rays to the Royals, and Johnny Damon and Mark Ellis to the Athletics from the Royals.

Hinch was released by the Royals after the 2002 season. He signed as a minor league free agent with the Cleveland Indians, but was purchased by the Detroit Tigers from the Indians in March 2003. He signed with the Philadelphia Phillies for the 2004 season, splitting the year between the majors and Triple-A. He spent all of 2005 with the Phillies' Triple-A affiliate before retiring. In an eight-season major league career, Hinch had a .219 batting average with 32 home runs and 112 runs batted in in 350 games.

Managing career

Arizona Diamondbacks
After the 2005 season, the Arizona Diamondbacks hired Hinch as their manager of minor league operations. Even while playing, he was planning his post-playing career. He went so far as to go to the 2003 general manager's winter meetings to look for future job opportunities and contacts. In July , Baseball America named him one of baseball's "10 to watch" in the next 10 years for his promise as a farm director and future general manager. In August 2006, the Diamondbacks named Hinch director of player development.

Hinch was named manager of the Arizona Diamondbacks on May 8, 2009, replacing Bob Melvin, despite never having managed or coached a team at any level. At age 34 years and 357 days, Hinch became the youngest person to be named manager of a Major League team since Eric Wedge (34 years, 275 days).

Hinch was fired from the Diamondbacks on July 1, 2010, following a 31–48 start to the 2010 season. Overall he compiled an 89–123 record in 212 games. His .420 winning percentage ranks as the lowest for a non-interim manager in Diamondbacks history.

San Diego Padres
The San Diego Padres hired Hinch as vice president of professional scouting on September 21, 2010. He resigned from the position on August 5, 2014.

Houston Astros
Hinch was named manager of the Houston Astros on September 29, 2014, replacing Bo Porter, who was fired on September 1, 2014. In the 2015 season, Hinch led the Astros to an 86–76 record and a wild card berth. It was Houston's first playoff appearance since 2005. In the Wild Card Game, the Astros defeated the New York Yankees in Yankee Stadium 3–0 to advance to the American League Division Series. In the ALDS, Hinch's Astros took a 2–1 series lead against the Kansas City Royals. The Astros led the Royals 6–2 in Game 4 going into the 8th inning before the Royals came back to win 9–6. The Astros lost game 5 and the series.

In 2016, Houston began the season 7–17. Although their play improved during the season, the Astros finished 84–78 and did not qualify for the playoffs.

In 2017, the Astros achieved a club record of 50 wins in 74 games and finished the regular season 101–61, winning their first division title in 16 years and first since joining the American League. The 2017 postseason began at home for the Astros. Hinch guided the team past the Boston Red Sox in four games, with his decision to have Justin Verlander pitch in relief in the deciding Game 4 receiving attention. In the 2017 American League Championship Series, he led the Astros against the New York Yankees in Houston's first championship series appearance in 12 years. After his team won the first two games at home, the Yankees rallied with three wins in New York, with Game 4's loss resulting from the bullpen giving up six combined runs in the 7th and 8th after Hinch took out pitcher Lance McCullers Jr after only six innings. With a pivotal Game 6 in Houston and Justin Verlander on the mound, the Astros won the game 7–1. In Game 7, he chose Charlie Morton (who went five innings) as his starter and McCullers to pitch the final four in relief as the Astros shutout the Yankees 4–0 to clinch their first ever AL pennant and first overall pennant in 12 years to advance to the 2017 World Series, which they won in 7 games. He used the same four pitchers he had used in the ALCS (Dallas Keuchel, Justin Verlander, Lance McCullers and Charlie Morton) for the World Series, though only McCullers and Morton received wins as two relievers (Chris Devenski and Joe Musgrove) also received wins. He led the Astros to their first World Series victory, defeating the Los Angeles Dodgers 4 games to 3. In the final game, Morton pitched the final four innings as the Astros won 5–1 to clinch their first ever title. With the win, Hinch has the most playoff victories as a manager of the Astros, with 14, eclipsing the previous record of 13 by Phil Garner.

On August 30, 2018, the Astros signed Hinch to a four-year extension.

The Astros Lost to the Washington Nationals 4 games to 3 in 2019 World Series. On January 13, 2020, During the offseason, Hinch and Jeff Luhnow, the team's general manager, were suspended one year for violating MLB policies in a sign stealing scandal in 2017. The investigation revealed that Hinch did not approve of the players using a replay monitor to decode signs, and even went as far as to wreck the monitor on at least two occasions. However, he admitted that he did not stop the practice or explicitly let it be known that he disapproved of it. Baseball Commissioner Rob Manfred harshly criticized Hinch for not doing more to stop the scheme. According to Manfred, the manager is responsible for "ensuring that the players both understand the rules and adhere to them.” Manfred concluded that there was "no justification for Hinch's failure to act,” since Hinch was the players’ immediate supervisor. If Hinch commits further "material violations" of baseball rules, he will be permanently banned from baseball. Hinch fully expected to be suspended, but believed Manfred would only suspend him for a month at most.

The year-long suspension was the second-most severe punishment in baseball history meted out to a manager for in-game misconduct. The only longer suspension was for St. Louis Browns manager Jack O'Connor, who was banned for life for trying to throw the 1910 American League batting title to Nap Lajoie by bribing the official scorer to change a hit on error to a hit in the final game of the season. Boston Red Sox manager Alex Cora was also handed a year-long suspension for his role in the scandal, but was sanctioned for his actions as the Astros' bench coach.

On the same day, Astros owner Jim Crane fired Hinch and Luhnow, saying, "Neither one of them started this but neither one of them did anything about it." Crane said that he was going beyond MLB's sanctions because he had "higher standards for the city and the franchise."  Largely on the strength of his final three seasons–all but one of the four 100-win seasons in franchise history at the time of his firing–Hinch ended his tenure as the second winningest manager in Astros history, behind only Bill Virdon. As of the end of the 2019 season, his .594 winning percentage is the highest in franchise history.

Detroit Tigers
On October 30, 2020, Hinch was named the manager of the Detroit Tigers, agreeing on a multi-year contract.

Managerial record

See also
 Houston Astros award winners and league leaders

References

External links

A. J. Hinch at Baseball Gauge

1974 births
Living people
All-American college baseball players
American expatriate baseball players in Canada
Arizona Diamondbacks managers
Baseball players at the 1996 Summer Olympics
Baseball players from Iowa
Detroit Tigers managers
Detroit Tigers players
Edmonton Trappers players
Houston Astros managers
Kansas City Royals players
Major League Baseball catchers
Major League Baseball farm directors
Medalists at the 1996 Summer Olympics
Modesto A's players
Oakland Athletics players
Olympic bronze medalists for the United States in baseball
Omaha Royals players
People from Midwest City, Oklahoma
People from Waverly, Iowa
Philadelphia Phillies players
Sacramento River Cats players
Scranton/Wilkes-Barre Red Barons players
Stanford Cardinal baseball players
Toledo Mud Hens players
Vancouver Canadians players
World Series-winning managers